Penny Wolin (born June 5, 1953), also known as Penny Diane Wolin and Penny Wolin-Semple, is an American portrait photographer and a visual anthropologist. She has exhibited solo at the Smithsonian Institution and is the recipient of two grants from the National Endowment for the Humanities and one grant from the National Endowment for the Arts. Her work is held in the permanent collections of such institutions as Harvard University, the Layton Art Collection at the Milwaukee Art Museum, the Santa Barbara Museum of Art, the New York Public Library and the Smithsonian American Art Museum. Known for her documentary and conceptual photographs, she has completed commissions for major corporations, national magazines and private collectors, including the Walt Disney Corporation, LIFE Magazine and the Brant Foundation. For over 30 years, she has used photographic portraiture with oral interviews to research Jewish civilization in America.

Youth and Education 
Wolin is the youngest of five children born into a Conservadox Jewish family in Cheyenne, Wyoming. Her father, Morris Aaron Wolin (ne Wolinsky) immigrated there as a child, directly from the Russian town of Grodno, later to become a businessman. Her mother, Helen Sobol Wolin, came from Denver, Colorado, and was an artist. At age 10, Penny began using a Kodak Brownie Hawkeye. At age 16, her brother Michael Wolin gave her a high quality rangefinder camera and the necessary darkroom equipment to begin a career.

Wolin attended the University of Wyoming and then was graduated from Art Center College of Design in Pasadena, California, majoring in photography and film. She then attended a masters' program in the department of cultural anthropology at the University of California, Los Angeles, under the mentorship of Cultural Anthropologist Johannes Wilbert. Then, she was awarded a directing fellowship to the American Film Institute, Center for Advanced Film and Television Studies.

Documentary Projects

Guest Register 

In 1975 at 21 years of age, while studying at ArtCenter College of Design, Penny Wolin moved into a Single Room Occupancy hotel, the St. Francis in Hollywood, California, and photographed and interviewed selected residents of the rooms. She created 34 black and white photographs with excerpted texts for Guest Register, an empathic work of documentary insight for the young photographer. The hotel, located on the corner of Hollywood Boulevard and Western Avenue, sheltered a range of people from all ages and walks of life, staying from one night to thirty years. This work brought Wolin to the attention of graphic designers such as Lloyd Ziff, Art Director at New West Magazine; Bob Cato at A&M Records; and Marvin Israel; a graphic designer working in New York. After seeing Wolin's photography, Ziff commissioned Wolin to photograph Ansel Adams and George Burns; Cato commissioned Wolin to photograph the rock group The Band; Israel began designing a book maquette for publication by the Aperture Foundation and the Los Angeles County Museum of Art invited her to participate in a group exhibition. After 47 years and a career brought about by Guest Register, book publication by Crazy Woman Creek Press, Cheyenne, Wyoming, has been released on September 14, 2022.

Descendants of Light: American Photographers of Jewish Ancestry

In 2005, Wolin began researching Descendants of Light: American Photographers of Jewish Ancestry. Since the 1850s, these photographers have contributed to journalistic, fashion, portrait, advertising and fine art photography. By photographing and interviewing each photographer, (or interviewing the living descendants of those who have died) re-photographing heirloom images of their ancestors and showcasing an iconic image that is of their own creation, Wolin is able to visually and verbally document a multi-generational story of the intersection between American Jewish culture, modern America and the history and practice of photography. Jewish-American photographers interviewed and photographed by Wolin include Lillian Bassman, Jo Ann Callis, Lauren Greenfield, Elinor Carucci, Lois Greenfield, Bruce Davidson, Annie Leibovitz, Herman Leonard, Helen Levitt, Jay Maisel, Joel Meyerowitz, Arnold Newman, Robert Frank and Joel-Peter Witkin. Posthumous interviews include the families of Philippe Halsman, Herb Ritts, Nickolas Muray, Arthur Rothstein, Roman Vishniac and Garry Winogrand. A book of the same title is published by Crazy Woman Creek Press.

The Jews of Wyoming: Fringe of the Diaspora

In 1982 Wolin met the late Shirley Burden, the major donor to the photography department of The Museum of Modern Art. With his encouragement and financial assistance as well as that of two National Endowment for the Humanities grants, as administered through the Wyoming Council for the Humanities, Wolin completed a visual and verbal study of 140 years and five generations of Jewish culture in Wyoming. The Jews of Wyoming: Fringe of The Diaspora was sponsored by what is now known as the Skirball Cultural Center in Los Angeles, California, and exhibited solo at the Smithsonian Institution, National Museum of American History, National Museum of American Jewish History, Judah L. Magnes Museum and Ucross Foundation. A book of the same title is published by Crazy Woman Creek Press.

Jackalopes, Cowboys and Coalmines: A Photographic Survey of Wyoming
In 1978, Wolin was awarded a National Endowment for the Arts major survey grant to complete Jackalopes, Cowboys and Coalmines: A Photographic Survey of Wyoming. Because of Wyoming's mineral and oil-rich natural resources, the state's history had been one of a boom or bust economy and culture. A national energy crisis made for a huge energy boom in Wolin's native state. This energy boom brought a final "Americanization" to the rural towns that sparsely dotted the least populated state in the union. Shopping malls and fast food outlets arrived; local downtown businesses closed, and the existing ranch economy was in turmoil. A worker's wage to tend cattle was no match for the higher wages being paid to work in an open-pit coal mine or a drilling rig. Traveling during each season throughout Wyoming, Wolin photographed and interviewed the native and newly arriving residents, ranging from cowboys to oilfield roughnecks to elected officials. The resulting work became a traveling exhibition that toured Wyoming as sponsored by then Governor Ed Herschler. The photographs and text are now held in the permanent collection of the Wyoming State Museum and the Smithsonian Institution, American Art Museum.

Selected Grants and Fellowships

Public Lectures 

 92Y; New York, New York 
 Book Passage; Corte Madera, California
George Eastman Museum; Rochester, New York
 The Image Flow; Mill Valley, California
 Jackson Art Center; Jackson Hole, Wyoming
Jewish Community Library; San Francisco, California
 Limmud; University of Nottingham, Nottingham, England
 National Museum of American Jewish History; Philadelphia
 Newhouse School of Public Communications; Syracuse, New York
 Sheridan Public Library; Sheridan, Wyoming
 Skirball Cultural Center; Los Angeles, California
 Smithsonian Institution, Museum of American History; Washington, D.C.
 Toyota Endowed Lecture Series; Pasadena, California
 Vroman's Bookstore; Pasadena, California
 Wyoming Jewish Rendezvous; Cheyenne, Wyoming
 Wyoming State Museum; Cheyenne, Wyoming
National Museum of Wildlife Art; Jackson Hole, Wyoming

Selected Exhibitions

Selected Assignments 

 Roman Vishniac Estate: working with Mara Vishniac-Kohn to restore and print her father's photo microscopy work.
 Life (magazine): American Dreamer column with Anne Fadiman
 Life (magazine): American Dreamer portrait of Ursula K. Le Guin
 Wet (magazine): cover of Teri Garr, multiple article illustrations
 Playboy (magazine): Twenty Questions; Second City Television, John Matuszak, Charlton Heston, Bubba Smith, Leigh Steinberg, Ron Howard
 Discover (magazine): John Schwarz
 Conde Nast Traveler: As Others See Us; International Travel to Thailand, Hong Kong, Singapore, and Hawaii
 Rolling Stone (magazine): The Band, James Caan, Melissa Manchester, Chaka Kahn, Michael Mann
 Esquire (magazine): Jon Jerde
 Forbes (magazine): David Geffen, Joe Roth, Eric Schmidt
 Graphis Inc. (magazine): cover of the artist Michael Schwab
 Vanity Fair (magazine), Discover magazine, Vogue magazine, Travel & Leisure magazine
 Sonoma Valley Film Festival: Art, Passion and Politics. Films by or about Women; Program Director
 Wolfgang Puck Food Company: restaurant interiors for Barbara Lazaroff, co-owner and designer
 Charles Schulz Museum: photographs of on-site art installations by the artists Michael Hayden and Yoshiteru Otani
 Peter Michael Winery, Cakebread Cellars, Kendall-Jackson Winery, Benovia Winery
 Cedars-Sinai Medical Center: Discoveries magazine cover and other in-house publications

Selected Clients 
 The Braid Performance and Exhibition Space
 Brant Foundation
 Charles Schulz Museum
 Cheyenne Frontier Days
 Condé Nast Traveler
 Esquire Magazine
 Forbes Magazine
 Fortune Magazine
 KCRW, National Public Radio
 LIFE Magazine
 Los Angeles Music Center
 Los Angeles Magazine
 Mother Jones Magazine
 Money Magazine
 New York Times
 Peter Michael Winery
 Playboy Magazine
 Progressive Insurance
 Rolling Stone Magazine
 Stanford Alumni Magazine
 Time Magazine
 Union Pacific Railroad
 Vogue Magazine
 Vanity Fair
 Walt Disney Corporation
 Wolfgang Puck Food Company

Teaching Positions

Selected Reviews 

The New York Times, She Checked In, and Immediately Checked Out Her Neighbors Matthew Specktor writes, "What makes “Guest Register” so remarkable is not just its gentle spirit, nor even its democratic reach, but rather the expansiveness that grows out of these things together. Captioned in a way that is at once playful and exacting, and coupled with a brief essay that collapses the space between what Wolin calls “existential Hollywood” and the actual place, these portraits show the opposite of what you might expect: a world in which dreams may be diminished but their originators, these noble occupants of the St. Francis Hotel, are radiant, beautiful, timelessly alive." New York Times Book Review, December 2, 2022</ref>The Los Angeles Times, Intimate portraits of St. Francis Hotel residents in 1975 capture a bygone Hollywood era: Deborah Vankin writes, "In the spring of 1975, Penny Wolin, a 21-year-old art student from Cheyenne, Wyo., moved into the storied St. Francis Hotel in Hollywood. The formerly upscale establishment, built in the 1920s, was by then a rough-around-the-edges, pay-by-the-week, brick hotel that had seen better days. Wolin lived there for three weeks to document its residents — a mix of misfits and dreamers, transients, artists and adventurers — for a photography project at ArtCenter College of Design." 7 photographs posted online: September 13, 2022.The New York Times, California Today: Mike McPhate writes, "In the charred rubble of Santa Rosa it was the McDonald's that drew Penny Wolin, a photographer who lives nearby.
Touring the destruction last week, she was stunned by the amount of destruction. 'I had to really calm down,' she said." 6 photographs posted online: October 20, 2017. "Kirkus Reviews, "Descendants of Light: American Photographers of Jewish Ancestry": "The entries, arranged alphabetically, offer an intriguing range of opinions, styles, eras, and insights, together with large, beautifully reproduced photographs… A rich, well-documented collection for students of photography and Jewish culture."
 The Wall Street Journal, What To Give Photography Books: William Meyers writes, "Rather than speculate on why so many Jews have been involved in photography, Penny Wolin, herself a Jewish photographer, decided to ask them. In Descendants of Light: American Photographers of Jewish Ancestry (Crazy Woman Creek Press, 244 pages) she has testimony from or about Diane Arbus, Richard Avedon, Bruce Davidson, Philippe Halsman, Annie Leibovitz, Helen Levitt, Rosalind Solomon, Alfred Stieglitz, and more than 60 others."The New York Jewish Week, In Search of the Jewish Angle on Things: Sandee Brawarsky writes, "Penny Wolin has been described as 'a street photographer who knocks on the door.' She has the openness, spontaneity and spirit of the street, along with the gift of conversation. Working on her new book, Descendants of Light: American Photographers of Jewish Ancestry (Crazy Woman Creek Press), she traversed the country to meet photographers in their homes and studios."The New York Jewish Week, Text Content - The Photography Issue: Sandee Brawarsky writes, "Photographer Penny Wolin raises a key question as to why so many Jews are drawn to the field of photography; her piece previews her work-in-progress of crossing the country, interviewing photographers."University Press of Mississippi, Through the Lens of the City: NEA Photography Surveys of the 1970s: In an interview with Mark Rice, Wolin notes, "Wyoming was not inundated with the mass American culture. There wasn't a McDonald's in every town nor a Holiday Inn. I could see that was changing and felt compelled to document people and their sense of the changes." Rice writes, "Although Wolin didn't particularly like the influx of corporate services chains, her 1978 survey was not an indictment of the changes in Wyoming. It was, instead, a project that sought to document "America's last frontier…small town societies, and the western spirit." A press release from the Wyoming Council on the Arts noted that Wolin's central concern was "the final and inevitable assimilation of the Old West into the American culture." (emphasis added.) Wolin's survey was less an overtly political act than a nod to a passing way of life."San Francisco Chronicle, Mick Lasalle writes, " [...the most exciting aspect of the festival is its resurrection of past classics, giving the public a chance to see a trio of great black-and-white films in their original splendor... Penny Wolin, the programming chair of the festival, chose 'Olympia' on the basis of artistic quality and importance." "If you want to show documentaries by or about women," says Wolin, "the greatest ones ever made were by Leni Riefenstahl."San Francisco Chronicle, Jon Carroll writes, "She had a wonderful way with black and white portrait work, and a loving approach to her subjects...in my mail arrived a splendid book called The Jews of Wyoming: Fringe of the Diaspora.Los Angeles Times, Gregory Rodriguez in his review of The Jews of Wyoming writes, 'Wolin tells the more complex story of adaptation and evolution. Wolin, a documentary photographer who has made a living for the last two decades photographing celebrities, spent 15 years putting together this triumphant epic of the 150-year history of Jews in the Cowboy State. ...Indeed, the book's wide range of images and personalities is what gives it its dynamism. Wolin has not sought to define what it means to be Jewish in the least populated state of the union. Instead, she seems to revel in the multiplicity of definitions among believers and nonbelievers; those who identify strongly as Jews and those who do not. Her subjects are posed in the settings or with the props that make them unique as individuals. A young member of the Future Farmers of America holds a pig by its hind legs before an open field. 'I don't eat them,' he says. 'But I give someone else a good product.'" The Washington Post, At National Museum of American History: Sarah Booth Conroy writes, "Going through the exhibition takes time as the viewer tries to understand the text and the photographs, both works of art. The words and pictures are so poignant and sometimes so surprising that they are worth the study. Wolin is a fine photographer and a first-class interviewer and her choices of people on whom to focus are inspired."Los Angeles Times, "An unlikely people in an unlikely place, the Jews of Wyoming did not become "the cowboy mensches " entertainer Mickey Katz sang about in his Yiddish rendition of I'm an Old Cowhand. Their co-existence alongside such an incongruous culture, however, did make them an unusual microcosm of the Jewish experience in the United States."Los Angeles Times, Art Review: 'Hollywood' Resembles A Cutting-room Floor, Colin Gardner writes, "The show's one saving grace is its photography, in particular Penny Wolin's Diane Arbus-like Guest Register (1975), a poignant yet devastating documentation of the residents of the St. Francis Hotel near the Hollywood Walk of Fame. Combining image and text, Wolin's examination of life's lost souls and anonymous citizens who are just passing through manages to be both emotionally distanced without being condescending."American Photographer magazine, Getting a Grip on Hollywood: David Roberts writes in his feature article, "She is...a methodical, quiet professional who uses large negatives, poses her subjects carefully and concentrates on details... Unlike so many top photographers, Wolin is good at paying attention to other people and at submerging her ego to that of her subject."

 References 

 External links 
 
 Wyoming State Museum Oral History with Penny Wolin by Mark Junge 
 Yiddish Book Center Interview with Penny Wolin
 New York Jewish Week,'' Interview with Penny Wolin by Sandee Brawarsky  
 Encyclopaedia Judaica

American portrait photographers
 
American women anthropologists
21st-century American Jews
American people of Russian-Jewish descent
20th-century American women photographers
20th-century American photographers
21st-century American women photographers
21st-century American photographers
1953 births
 
Alumni
Visual anthropologists
Documentary photographers
Living people
People from Cheyenne, Wyoming
21st-century American women
Women photojournalists